Kldekari is a mountain (2000 m.) and a rocky pass in the Trialeti range, southeastern Georgia. In the vicinity are the ruins of a medieval Kldekari Fortress.

Mountains of Georgia (country)
Geography of Kvemo Kartli